The discography of the Japanese band Nico Touches the Walls consists of eight studio albums, 27 extended plays, eleven singles, seven promotional singles, seven video albums, and 26 music videos.

Nico Touches the Walls (stylized as NICO Touches the Walls) was a Japanese rock band formed in 2004. In the same year, they won the Lotte Prize at the Yamaha Teen Music Festival. Rising quickly, they signed to "Senha & Co." before signing to Sony Music Japan's Ki/oon Records in 2007. Their debut single, "Yoru no Hate" was released in February 2008, and received a positive reaction from the public.

The band has also had songs used in anime, such as "Broken Youth", "Diver", and "Niwaka Ame ni mo Makezu", in Naruto Shippuden, "Hologram" in Fullmetal Alchemist: Brotherhood, and "Matryoshka" in C.

Albums

Studio albums

Compilation albums

Extended plays

Singles
 "アボガド" (September 6, 2006)
 "(My Sweet)Eden" (June 13, 2007)
 "Yoru no Hate" (February 20, 2008)
 "The Bungy" (June 4, 2008)
 "Broken Youth" (August 13, 2008)
 "Big Foot" (May 13, 2009)
 "Hologram" (August 12, 2009)
 "Kakera: Subete no Omoitachi e" (November 4, 2009)
 "Sudden Death Game" (August 11, 2010)
 "Diver" (January 12, 2011)
 "Te o Tatake" (August 17, 2011)
 "Natsu no Daisankakkei" (May 16, 2012)
 "Natsu no Daisankakkei (2012 Live In Makuhari)" (August 1, 2012)
 "Yume 1 Go" (December 19, 2012)
 "Mr. Echo" (March 27, 2013)
 "Niwaka Ame ni Mo Makezu" (July 10, 2013)
 "Rawhide" (March 5, 2014)
 "Tenchi Gaeshi (TV Size)" (April 30, 2014)
 "Tenchi Gaeshi" (June 11, 2014)
 "バケモノ" (July 1, 2014)
 "TOKYO Dreamer (TV Size)" (August 13, 2014)
 "TOKYO Dreamer" (August 20, 2014)
 "Massuguna Uta" (July 19, 2015)
 "Uzu to Uzu" (September 2, 2015)
 "Strato" (May 3, 2016)
 "渦と渦 ~西の渦~ Live At 大阪城ホール" (June 1, 2016)
 "Mashi Mashi" (November 30, 2016)
 "Vibrio Vulnificus" (July 14, 2018)

References

Discographies of Japanese artists